The People's University of Amsterdam, also known as Volks Universiteit Amsterdam or Folk University, is a course centre for adults in Amsterdam. In 1784, the Dutch Maatschappij tot Nut van 't Algemeen was founded. Around 1900, there were about 20 so-called “Toynbee-associations”to English example adult education offered to the lowest social classes. Volksuniversiteit Amsterdam was founded in 1913 and has various study centres in Amsterdam. Since 2016, the Volksuniversiteit Amsterdam works together with the Amsterdam Public Library (Openbare Bibliotheek Amsterdam).

International Colleagues 
The American Chautauqua Institution, originally the Chautauqua Lake Sunday School Assembly, was founded in 1874 "as an educational experiment in out-of-school, vacation learning. It was broadened almost immediately beyond courses for Sunday school teachers to include academic subjects, music, art, and physical education". In the Netherlands the Volksuniversiteit Amsterdam was founded in 1913 by the Maatschappij tot Nut van't Algemeen. Today the Dutch Association of Volksuniversiteiten (BNVU) has 75 Volksuniversities. In Flanders they are called Volkshogeschool. The Freie Deutsche Hochschule (Germany) was founded in Paris on November 19, 1935 as an exile institution. The teaching followed the ideological requirements of the popular front policy. The activities ended with the invasion of German troops in France in 1940. Since 1942 Scandinavia has the Folkuniversitetet and in 1959 Slovenia founded the Ljudska Univerza Kocevje.

References

External links
 Volksuniversiteit Amsterdam (official website)
Openbare Bibliotheek Amsterdam (official website)

Universities in the Netherlands
Schools in Amsterdam